The Lure of London is a 1914 British silent drama film directed by Bert Haldane and starring Ivy Close, Edward Viner and M. Gray Murray. It is based on a play of the same title by Arthur Applin.

Cast
 Ivy Close as Daisy Westbury  
 Edward Viner as William Anderson  
 M. Gray Murray as Charlie Brooks  
 William Harbord as Sir John Westbury  
 Leal Douglas as Lady Westbury  
 Gwenda Wren as Olga Westbury  
 Lempriere Pringle as George Stamford 
 F.W. Trotti as Brooks - a Coster  
 M. Delarue as Mrs. Brooks

References

Bibliography
 Goble, Alan. The Complete Index to Literary Sources in Film. Walter de Gruyter, 1999.

External links

1914 films
1914 drama films
British silent feature films
British drama films
Films set in London
Films directed by Bert Haldane
British films based on plays
British black-and-white films
1910s English-language films
1910s British films
Silent drama films